is a very common Japanese given name used by either sex.

Possible writings
Yū can be written using different kanji characters and can mean:
優, "tenderness" or "superiority"
夕, "evening"
友, "friend"
有, "qualified"
勇, "courage"
祐, "help"
裕, "abundant"
雄, "masculine"
悠, "permanence"
由宇, "reason, eaves"
侑, "assist"
The name can also be written in hiragana or katakana.

People
with the given name Yū
Yu Aida (裕), a Japanese manga artist and illustrator
Yū Aoi (優), a Japanese actress
Yū Asagiri (夕), a Japanese manga artist
Yū Asakawa (悠, born 1975), a Japanese voice actress
Yu Darvish (有), an Iranian-Japanese starting pitcher
, Japanese footballer
Yū Hayami (優), a Japanese pop singer and actress
Yū Hasebe (優), a Japanese actress, singer and model
Yū Hayashi (勇), a Japanese voice actor and singer 
Yuu Kashii (由宇), a Japanese actress and model
Yuu Kikkawa (友), a Japanese pop singer
Yū Kikumura (憂), a member of the Japanese Red Army
, Japanese boxer
, Japanese footballer
Yū Kobayashi (ゆう, born 1982), a Japanese voice actress
, Japanese footballer
Yū Koyama (ゆう), a Japanese manga artist
, Japanese artistic gymnast
, Japanese sport wrestler
Yuu Miyake (優), a Japanese composer and sound engineer
Yū Mizushima (裕), a Japanese voice actor
Yu Nakajima (悠), a Japanese Rubik's Cube solver
, Japanese women's footballer
, Japanese voice actress
, Japanese voice actress and singer
, usually written You Shiina, Japanese illustrator and manga artist
Yū Shimaka (裕), a Japanese voice actor
, Japanese voice actress
Yuu Shirota (優), a Japanese-Spanish actor and singer
Yuu Shiroyama (優), real name of The Gazette's guitarist Aoi
Yū Sugimoto (ゆう), a Japanese voice actress
Yu Suzuki (裕), a Japanese game designer and producer
Yu Takahashi (高橋 優), a Japanese singer-songwriter
Yū Terashima (優), a Japanese manga artist
Yu Todoroki (悠), a Japanese Takarasienne
Yū Wakui: (和久井 優), a Japanese voice actress
Yuu Watase (悠宇), a Japanese shōjo manga artist
Yuu Yabuuchi (優), a Japanese manga artist
Yu Yagami (裕), a Japanese manga artist
Yu Yamada (優), a Ryukyuan model, actress, and singer
Yu Yokoyama (裕), a member of the Japanese idol group Kanjani8

Fictional characters
with the given name Yū
 Yu Kajima (カジマ), a character from the Gundam anime series
 Yuu Asou (麻生 優雨), a character from the Fatal Frame III: The Tormented video game series
 Yū Kanda (ユウ), a main character in the manga series D.Gray-man
 Yū Komori (ユウ), a main character in Spider-Man: The Manga
 Yuu Matsuura (遊), a central character in the shōjo manga series Marmalade Boy
 Yū Nishinoya (夕), a character from the Haikyū!! anime series
 Yuu Kashima (遊), a character from the Monthly Girls' Nozaki-kun anime series
 Yu Ominae (優), the main character of the manga series Spriggan
 Yu Narukami (鳴上 悠), the official name of the protagonist of Persona 4
 Yū Kōtari (神足 ユウ), a character from the BLACK★ROCK SHOOTER anime series
 Yu Ishigami (石上 優), a character from the manga series Kaguya-sama: Love is War
 Yuu Otosaka (乙坂 有宇), a character from the anime television series Charlotte
 , a character from the anime series Love Live! Nijigasaki High School Idol Club
 Yū, a character from Dōbutsu no Mori (film)
 Yū Naruse (usually called Yuu-chan), a main character in the manga WataMote
 Yū Koito (小糸 侑), the main character from the anime Bloom into You
 Yū Nanba (難波 悠), a supporting character and party member in Yakuza: Like a Dragon

Japanese unisex given names